Jalan Tun Hamdan Sheikh Tahir (Penang state route P123, formerly known as Jalan Bertam) is a major road in Penang, Malaysia. It is also a main route to North–South Expressway Northern Route via Bertam Interchange.

List of junctions

References

Roads in Penang